Helga Nowitzki (née Bredenbröcker) is a German former international basketball player. She is the mother of Dirk and Silke Nowitzki.

National team career 
Nowitzki was a member of the West Germany national team that participated at the 1966 EuroBasket Women. Over five tournament games, she averaged 0.2 points per game.

References

1940s births
Living people
German women's basketball players
Year of birth missing (living people)
Place of birth missing (living people)